Matúš Bero (born 6 September 1995) is a Slovak professional footballer who plays as a midfielder for Eredivisie club Vitesse and the Slovakia national team.

Club career
Bero made his professional debut for AS Trenčín senior side on 21 July 2013 in the Corgoň Liga match against Spartak Trnava.

On 3 July 2018, Bero agreed to join Dutch side Vitesse on a four-year deal.

On 18 november 2021, Bero prolonged his contract at Vitesse with one year with option for another year.

International career
Bero has represented various youth Slovak teams, and made his debut for the Slovakia national football team in a 3–1 friendly win over Georgia on 27 May 2016.

International goals
As of match played 20 November 2022. Scores and results list Slovakia's goal tally first.

Career statistics

Honours

Club
AS Trenčín
 Fortuna Liga: 2014–15, 2015–16
 Slovnaft Cup: 2014–15, 2015–16

Individual
 Fortuna Liga Young Player of the Year 2014–15
Peter Dubovský Award: 2015

External links
 
 Fortuna Liga profile
 AS Trenčín profile

References

1995 births
Living people
People from Ilava
Sportspeople from the Trenčín Region
Slovak footballers
Slovak expatriate footballers
Slovakia international footballers
Slovakia youth international footballers
Slovakia under-21 international footballers
Association football midfielders
AS Trenčín players
Trabzonspor footballers
SBV Vitesse players
Slovak Super Liga players
Süper Lig players
Eredivisie players
Slovak expatriate sportspeople in Turkey
Expatriate footballers in Turkey
Expatriate footballers in the Netherlands
Slovak expatriate sportspeople in the Netherlands